7th TFCA Awards 
December 17, 2003

Best Film: 
 Lost in Translation 
The 7th Toronto Film Critics Association Awards, honoring the best in film for 2003, were held on 17 December 2003.

Winners 
 Best Actor:
 Bill Murray – Lost in Translation
 Best Actress:
 Samantha Morton – Morvern Callar
 Best Animated Film:
 Finding Nemo
 Best Canadian Film:
 Spider
 Best Director:
 Peter Jackson – The Lord of the Rings: The Return of the King
 Best Documentary Film:
 Capturing the Friedmans
 Best Film:
 Lost in Translation
 Best First Feature:
 American Splendor
 Best Foreign Language Film:
 City of God • Brazil/France/United States
 Best Screenplay (tie):
 The Barbarian Invasions – Denys Arcand
 Lost in Translation – Sofia Coppola
 Best Supporting Actor:
 Peter Sarsgaard – Shattered Glass
 Best Supporting Actress:
 Miranda Richardson – Spider
 Special Citation:
 Peter Jackson, for his work on the Lord of the Rings trilogy as a whole.

References 

2003
2003 film awards
2003 in Toronto
2003 in Canadian cinema